Eric Leighton Holmes was a British chemist who developed ion exchange resins in 1935.

References

Howard N. Potts Medal recipients